The 1969 Bulgarian Cup Final was the 29th final of the Bulgarian Cup (in this period the tournament was named Cup of the Soviet Army), and was contested between CSKA Sofia and Levski Sofia on 30 April 1969 at Vasil Levski National Stadium in Sofia. CSKA won the final 2–1.

Match

Details

See also
1968–69 A Group

References

Bulgarian Cup finals
PFC CSKA Sofia matches
PFC Levski Sofia matches
Cup Final